Kurt Lechner (born 26 October 1942, Kaiserslautern) is a German politician and former Member of the European Parliament for Rhineland-Palatinate.

He is a member of the conservative Christian Democratic Union, part of the European People's Party. He resigned his seat in March 2012 due to age. He was replaced by Birgit Collin-Langen.

References

1942 births
Living people
MEPs for Germany 2004–2009
Christian Democratic Union of Germany MEPs
MEPs for Germany 1999–2004
MEPs for Germany 2009–2014
Recipients of the Cross of the Order of Merit of the Federal Republic of Germany